, is a historical palace which was located in present-day central Osaka city, Japan.

Construction of the palace was completed in 652 AD. The palace stood for 34 years before being destroyed by fire in 686 AD.

See also 
Naniwa-kyō

References

External links 
 Osaka Museum of History

Former capitals of Japan
History of Osaka Prefecture
Buildings and structures in Osaka
Historic Sites of Japan